WISEPA J025409.45+022359.1 (designation is abbreviated to WISE 0254+0223) is a brown dwarf of spectral class T8, located in constellation Cetus at approximately 22.3 light-years from Earth.

History of observations

Discovery
WISE 0254+0223 was discovered in 2011 from data, collected by Wide-field Infrared Survey Explorer (WISE) Earth-orbiting satellite — NASA infrared-wavelength 40 cm (16 in) space telescope, which mission lasted from December 2009 to February 2011. WISE 0254+0223 has two discovery papers: Scholz et al. (2011) and Kirkpatrick et al. (2011) (the first was published earlier).
 Scholz et al. discovered two late T-type brown dwarfs, including WISE 0254+0223, using preliminary data release from WISE and follow-up near-infrared spectroscopy with  near-infrared camera/spectrograph at the Large Binocular Telescope (LBT).
 Kirkpatrick et al. presented discovery of 98 new found by WISE brown dwarf systems with components of spectral types M, L, T and Y, among which also was WISE 0254+0223.

Distance

WISE 0254+0223 distance estimates

Non-trigonometric distance estimates are marked in italic. The most accurate estimate is marked in bold.

Space motion
WISE 0254+0223 has a large proper motion of about  milliarcseconds per year.

WISE 0254+0223 proper motion estimates

The most accurate estimates are marked in bold.

See also
Another object, discovered by Scholz et al. (2011):
 WISE 1741+2553 (T9)

Notes

References

External links
 Two new nearby brown dwarfs found  (Phil Plait August 9, 2011)
 Solstation.com (New Objects within 20 light-years)

Brown dwarfs
T-type stars
Cetus (constellation)
20110901
WISE objects